Arthur Little may refer to:

 Arthur Dehon Little (1863–1935), American chemist and chemical engineer
 Arthur D. Little, an international management consulting firm